Westoe was originally a village near South Shields, Tyne & Wear, England, but has since become part of the town and is now used to refer to the area of the town where the village once was. It is also an electoral ward for local politics purposes.

History

Westoe Village

The earliest recorded mention of Westoe is in 1072, which refers to a group of seven farms.

In the late 19th and early 20th centuries, the village of Westoe was around one mile south of South Shields (which was then part of County Durham until the formation of Tyne and Wear under the Local Government Act 1972), and was gradually absorbed into the urban sprawl extending from the centre of the town.

In contemporary usage, the term "Westoe Village" refers to a specific suburban road of the same name in the Westoe area of the town. It consists of Georgian and Victorian houses, many having been built by business leaders of the town, including those who owned mines and shipyards. It is considered one of the most exclusive areas of South Shields.

A number of houses which were historically in the village are not considered to be part of the modern-day Westoe Village. The semi-detached early-nineteenth century houses of Westoe Terrace have been absorbed into the late Victorian terrace of Dean Road.

Westoe Colliery
Westoe Colliery was one of many coal mines in the area. Opened in 1909, it operated until May 1993, when it was the last pit of its kind on Tyneside to close. The site of the colliery has since been cleared and redeveloped into Westoe Crown Village, which falls into the Horsley Hill ward of South Tyneside Council.

Westoe Cemetery
Westoe Cemetery was opened in 1857, and is now closed to new graves (although existing family graves can still be used). Notable local-born physician Dr Thomas Winterbottom, as well as barrister and politician Robert Ingham are buried in the cemetery.

The Westoe Netty
Westoe became locally famous as the inspiration for a popular painting, Westoe Netty, which illustrates a local public toilet (Netty is a Geordie dialect word for toilet). The original toilet was built in 1890 near a railway bridge on Chichester Road, near its junction with Westoe Road. To allow for regeneration, it was dismantled and put into storage in 1996. In 2008, the toilet was rebuilt as a permanent exhibit at the Beamish Museum.

Westoe Brewery 
Westoe had its own brewery, the Westoe Brewery, which stood on Dunelm Street (just off Westoe Road) from the 19th century, and although the exact date of origin is not apparent, it features on the 1915 Ordnance Survey maps (it is also reported to feature on the 1895 copy). The brewery continued under the ownership of Robert Henderson until 1907, when Joseph Johnson acquired it, and in 1924 merged it with the City Brewery from Durham. In 1938, the company became Westoe Breweries Limited, and in 1946 became public.

The breweries were taken over by Hammond United Breweries in 1960, and closed sometime between then and the 2000s.

In 2004, the Jarrow Brewing Company of nearby Jarrow purchased the former Chameleon pub on Claypath Lane, just off Westoe Road, reopening it as The Maltings in May 2005. They expanded their microbrewery output by installing a facility below this pub, producing 100 barrels a week. The company included in its beers, Westoe IPA and Westoe Netty Special.

On 27 September 2018, the company was dissolved.

Westoe Fair 

The annual village fair has musical entertainment, refreshments and games. A host of charity and voluntary organisations have stalls with tombolas, raffles and displays including the Rotary Club of South Tyneside and South Shields Local History Group.

Politics

Metropolitan Borough Council
Westoe is an electoral ward of South Tyneside Council, and stretches from Chichester Road and Leighton Street in the north, to Harton House Road in the south. In the 2007 local elections the ward returned three independent candidates; however, as of 2018 the ward had returned to three labour councillors. The ward population taken at the 2011 census was 8,080.

UK Parliament
Westoe is located in the South Shields constituency. Its 2017 electorate was estimated to consist of 6227 voters.

Transport

Road

Westoe Road (formerly Westoe Lane) forms part of the A1018 road from South Shields to Seaham, and was so named because it originally ran between South Shields and Westoe Village. What is now considered Westoe Village has limited vehicular access via St George's Avenue only, which contributes heavily to its tranquil reputation.

Tyne and Wear Metro
The Westoe area is served by the Chichester Metro station, the penultimate stop on the South Shields branch of the Tyne and Wear Metro rapid transit system.

Education 
The South Shields campus of South Tyneside College is located on St George's Avenue (just before access to Westoe Village) and serves further education to people ages 14 years and older.

Recreation

Westoe Rugby Football Club 

Westoe Rugby Football Club, which was established in 1875, is one of the oldest organisations still in the Westoe area today. The club has continuously occupied its original ground, directly opposite Westoe Village, since its establishment, and is today one of the local community hubs of the area.

Robert Readhead Park
Robert Readhead was a local businessman, and was the eldest son of John Readhead, who founded John Readhead and Sons Limited, a noted local shipwright and marine engineering firm. Joining his father's business as an apprentice, Readhead stuck with the firm and eventually became one of the directors, retiring from active involvement in 1909 to take a larger community role - something he continued for the next 40 years (including four years spent as mayor).

In 1921, Readhead donated the land on which the Robert Readhead park lies to the town in thanksgiving for peace. The park was opened on 18 May 1923, and features a 3 ft high scroll-style commemorative plaque which reads: Nowadays, the park has a bowls club (which includes a bowling pavilion), tennis courts, and a small children's play area.

Notable residents
 Elinor Brent-Dyer, author of the Chalet School books; born in South Shields; attended school in Westoe
 Catherine Cookson , author, lived at Tyne Dock, South Shields and would have visited Westoe, although she was not a resident.   It was the backdrop for a number of her romance novels
 William Fox, four time Prime Minister of New Zealand
 Robert Ingham, twice MP for South Shields, lived at Westoe House
 Joe McElderry, winner of The X Factor in 2009, pop/classical crossover singer and model; born and grew up in Westoe and still lives nearby
 Livingston Middlemost, born in Westoe; first-class cricketer
 Dame Flora Robson, actress; nominated for an Oscar for her role in Saratoga Trunk
 Andrew Stoddart, born in Westoe; played international cricket for England and rugby union for England and the British Isles; Wisden Cricketer of the Year in 1893

References

Suburbs of South Shields